Minister for Iceland was a post in the Danish cabinet for Icelandic affairs.

History
The post was established on 5 January 1874 as, according to the Constitution of Iceland, the executive power rested in the King of Denmark through the Danish cabinet. The Constitutional Act of Iceland of 3 October 1903 stated that the Minister for Iceland had to be a resident of Reykjavík and be able to read and write Icelandic. The minister was responsible to the Icelandic parliament. The post of Minister for Iceland was part of the post of Justice Minister of Denmark until 1904 when Iceland obtained extended home rule.

After an agreement with the Social Liberal government in Copenhagen in January 1917, Jón Magnússon formed the first coalition government consisting of three ministers and with a majority in the Althing behind it. Parliamentarism was thus implemented in Iceland. Jón Magnússon got the title forsætisráðherra Íslands (Prime Minister of Iceland, but literally chairman or president of the ministers), while all three ministers were also formally members of the Danish cabinet each with the title Minister of Iceland.

In 1918, the Danish–Icelandic Act of Union recognised Iceland as an independent and sovereign state in a personal union with Denmark. The Kingdom of Iceland was established and the post of Minister for Iceland was closed down on 30 November 1918.

List of ministers

Constitution (1874–1904)

Home rule (1904–1918)

See also
Prime Minister of Iceland

References
Dam, Poul (1996). Hvem var minister (3. edition). Aros. . 
Skou, Kaare R. (2005). Dansk politik A–Å. Aschehoug. . 
Sundbøl, Per (1978). Dansk Islandspolitik 1913-1918. Odense Universitetsforlag. . 

1874 establishments in Denmark
1918 disestablishments
Iceland
Iceland
Denmark–Iceland relations